Alfred Terance "Terry" Kinard (born November 24, 1959) is a former American college and professional football player who was a safety in the National Football League (NFL) for eight seasons during the 1980s and 1990s. He played college football at Clemson University, and was a two-time consensus All-American. Kinard was selected in the first round of the 1983 NFL Draft, and played professionally for the NFL's New York Giants and Houston Oilers.

Early years
Kinard was born in Bitburg, West Germany. He attended Sumter High School in Sumter, South Carolina, graduating with the class of 1978.

College career
He attended Clemson University, where he played for the Clemson Tigers football team from 1979 to 1982. Kinard was a two-time consensus first-team All-American for two years in a row. He was the CBS National Defensive Player of the Year in 1982 and selected to the USA Today All-College Football Team in the 1980s. Kinard is the all-time Clemson leader in interceptions with seventeen and tackles by a defensive back with 294.

His college career did not start smoothly. He suffered a separated shoulder in his first game and was out the rest of the season. He later said that having to redshirt turned out to be a good thing, as he was not physically ready to compete as a freshman.

Kinard was inducted into the College Football Hall of Fame in 2001.

Professional career
In his eight NFL seasons, Kinard played in 121 games, started 115 of them, made thirty-one interceptions and recovered seven fumbles.

Personal
Kinard married his wife Cassandra on June 21, 2003. Their son Jaden was born in 2004.

References

External links
 NFL.com player page

1959 births
Living people
All-American college football players
American football safeties
Clemson Tigers football players
College Football Hall of Fame inductees
Houston Oilers players
National Conference Pro Bowl players
New York Giants players
People from Bitburg
Ed Block Courage Award recipients